Héroes Inmortales XI (Spanish for "Immortal Heroes Eleven") was a professional wrestling event produced and scripted by the Mexican professional wrestling promotion Lucha Libre AAA World Wide (AAA). The event took place on October 1, 2017 at the Domo San Luis in San Luis Potosí, San Luis Potosí, Mexico. It was the eleventh annual AAA show held in honor of deceased founder Antonio Peña and featured the Copa Antonio Peña tournament named in his honor.

Production

Background
In 1992 then-Consejo Mundial de Lucha Libre (CMLL) booker and match maker Antonio Peña left the company alongside a number of wrestlers to form the Mexican professional wrestling, company Asistencia Asesoría y Administración, later known simply as "AAA". Over the next decade-and-a-half Peña and the team behind AAA built the promotion into one of the biggest wrestling companies in the world. On October 5, 2006 Peña died from a heart attack. After Peña's death his brother-in-law Jorge Roldan took control of the company with both his wife Marisela Peña, Antonio's sister, and Dorian Roldan (their son) also taking an active part in AAA. On October 7, 2007,AAA held a show in honor of Peña's memory, the first ever "Antonio Peña Memorial Show" (Homenaje an Antonio Peña in Spanish). The following year AAA held the second ever "Antonio Peña Memorial Show", making it an annual tradition for the company to commemorate the passing of their founder. In 2008 the show was rebranded as Héroes Inmortales (Spanish for "Immortal Heroes"), retroactively rebranding the 2007 and 2008 event as Héroes Inmortales I and Héroes Inmortales II.

AAA has held a Héroes Inmortales every year since then, with the 2017 version of the show being Héroes Inmortales XI (11). The Héroes Inmortales hosts the Copa Antonio Peña ("Antonio Peña Cup") tournament each year, a multi-man tournament with various wrestlers from AAA or other promotions competing for a trophy. The tournament format has usually been either a gauntlet match or a multi-man torneo cibernetico elimination match. For the 2017 show the winner of the Copa Antonio Peña would also win the AAA Latin American Championship.

Storylines
The Héroes Inmortales XI show featured eight professional wrestling matches with different wrestlers involved in pre-existing scripted feuds, plots and storylines. Wrestlers portrayed either heels (referred to as rudos in Mexico, those that portray the "bad guys") or faces (técnicos in Mexico, the "good guy" characters) as they followed a series of tension-building events, which culminated in a wrestling match or series of matches.

Results

Notes

References

2017 in professional wrestling
2017
2017 in Mexico
October 2017 events in Mexico